San Juan Raboso is a community in the municipality of Izúcar de Matamoros, Puebla, Mexico, with 3,637 inhabitants. 

Mexican Federal Highway 120 passes through the town.

References

Populated places in Puebla